Joseph Mark McShea (February 22, 1907 – November 28, 1991) was an American prelate of the Roman Catholic Church. He served as the first bishop of the Diocese of Allentown in Pennsylvania from 1961 to 1983.

Biography

Early life 
Joseph McShea was born in Lattimer, Luzerne County, Pennsylvania, one of seven children of Roger A. and Jeanette (née Beach) McShea. He received his early education at the parochial school of Transfiguration of Our Lord Parish in Philadelphia. He graduated from West Philadelphia Catholic High School for Boys in 1923, and then began his studies for the priesthood at St. Charles Borromeo Seminary in Philadelphia.

In 1926, he was sent to continue his studies in Rome at the Pontifical Roman Seminary and the Pontifical Lateran University. He earned a doctorate in theology in 1932.

Priesthood 
McShea was ordained a priest by Cardinal Francesco Marchetti Selvaggiani on December 6, 1931. His first assignment, following his return to Pennsylvania, was as a professor at St. Charles Borromeo Seminary, where he taught Latin, Italian, and history (1932–35). From 1935 to 1938, he served as a minutante of the Congregation for the Oriental Churches in the Roman Curia. He then returned to the United States, where he served as secretary of the Apostolic Delegation in Washington, D.C. (1938–52). He was named a papal chamberlain in August 1938, and raised to the rank of domestic prelate in April 1948.

Auxiliary Bishop of Philadelphia 
On February 8, 1952, McShea was appointed auxiliary bishop of the Archdiocese of Philadelphia and titular bishop of Mina by Pope Pius XII. He received his episcopal consecration on March 19, 195 2,  from Archbishop Amleto Cicognani, with Bishops Eugene J. McGuinness and William O'Brien serving as co-consecrators, at the Cathedral of SS. Peter and Paul. He selected as his episcopal motto: Sub Umbra Petri ("In the Shadow of Peter"). As an auxiliary bishop, he served as pastor of St. Francis de Sales Parish in Philadelphia.

Bishop of Allentown 
McShea was appointed the first bishop of the newly erected Diocese of Allentown by Pope John XXIII on February 11, 1961. His installation took place at the Cathedral of Saint Catharine of Siena in Allentown on April 11, 1961. In 1953, he was appointed president of the American Catholic Historical Society.

Between 1962 and 1965, McShea attended all four sessions of the Second Vatican Council in Rome. During the Council, he was one of 18 American bishops elected to the 10 commissions that facilitated the Council's work, and served as relator for the Commission for Religious.

McShea founded "Operation Rice Bowl" which began in the form of a small cardboard box in the parishes of the diocese to receive alms directed to relieving a famine in Africa. In 1976 it was adopted by the United States Conference of Catholic Bishops as a national program, and the following year assigned to Catholic Relief Services.

McShea helmed the founding of Holy Family Manor, a nursing and rehabilitation center at the former Eugene Grace mansion in Bethlehem, Pennsylvania. He also established Holy Family Villa, a retirement home for priests. He convened the first diocesan synod in May 1968. In 1969, McShea sued the board of directors of Sacred Heart Hospital to prevent a corporate merger with Allentown Hospital during the formation of the Allentown-Sacred Heart Hospital Center, in an effort to maintain the Catholic identity of Sacred Heart.

During his 22-year tenure, McShea oversaw the construction, purchase, and renovation of over 300 church buildings. In 1964, McShea, together with the Oblates of St. Francis de Sales, founded Allentown College.

Retirement and legacy 
On February 3, 1983, Pope Paul II accepted McShea's resignation as bishop of the Diocese of Allentown. McShea, long ill from diabetes and other ailments, died on November 28, 1991, at age 84, and is buried on the cathedral grounds.

References

1907 births
1991 deaths
St. Charles Borromeo Seminary alumni
Pontifical Lateran University alumni
Roman Catholic bishops in Pennsylvania
Roman Catholic Ecclesiastical Province of Philadelphia
Roman Catholic Diocese of Allentown
Participants in the Second Vatican Council
20th-century Roman Catholic bishops in the United States